Kurattissery is a village in Alappuzha district in the Indian state of Kerala.

Demographics
At the 2001 India census, Kurattissery had a population of 12256 with 5877 males and 6379 females.

References

Villages in Alappuzha district